The Sikorsky XHJS-1 (manufacturer designation S-53),  was developed by Sikorsky Aircraft to meet a Naval requirement for a utility helicopter. The XHJS-1 was not ordered into production and only two prototypes were built.

Design and development
Powered by a  Continental R-975-34, the S-53 was a development of the S-51 designed for use on aircraft carriers. The tail rotor was raised above head-height to give more clearance and the landing gear was made stronger to enable operations from a moving deck. Other enhancements were a folding main rotor and the option for amphibious landing gear. Two prototypes were ordered by the United States Navy as the XHJS-1 and the first flew on 22 September 1947. The type was evaluated against the Piasecki XHJP-1. With the Piasecki design being ordered as the HUP-1 by the Navy, the S-53 was not developed further.

Variants
XHJS-1
Prototype naval utility helicopter, two built.

Specifications (XHJS-1)

See also

References

Notes

Bibliography
 

United States military helicopters
1940s United States military utility aircraft
HJS
1940s United States helicopters
Single-engined piston helicopters
Aircraft first flown in 1947